Akdere is a village in the Adıyaman District, Adıyaman Province, Turkey. Its population is 175 (2021).

The hamlets of Akıncı, Akyazı and Yuvacık are attached to Akdere.

References

Villages in Adıyaman District

Kurdish settlements in Adıyaman Province